Circa (hispanicized spelling of Sirka, Aymara for vein of the body or a mine) is one of the nine districts of the Abancay Province in the Apurímac Region in Peru.

Geography 
Some of the highest mountains of the district are listed below:

Ethnic groups 
The people in the district are mainly indigenous citizens of Quechua descent. Quechua is the language which the majority of the population (79.43%) learnt to speak in childhood, 20.14% of the residents started speaking using the Spanish language (2007 Peru Census).

See also 
 Qiwllaqucha
 Wask'aqucha

References

Districts of the Abancay Province
Districts of the Apurímac Region